Nandini Shankar is an Indian violinist who performs Hindustani classical music and fusion. She is the daughter of Sangeeta Shankar and granddaughter of N. Rajam.

Early life 
Shankar started her training when she was 3 years old and gave her first public performance at 8. She gave her first full-fledged solo performance at the age of 13 years. She plays violin in the Gayaki Ang.

Personal life 
Nandini Shanker is grand daughter of  Indian violinist Padma Bhushan N. Rajam and her mother Dr Sangeeta Shanker is also highly acclaimed violinist. Nandini married the renowned Carnatic music fusion artist, Mahesh Raghvan on 9 May 2021.

Education 
Nandini Shankar excelled in academics. She completed her graduation in commerce, and is a qualified Indian Chartered Accountant (ICAI). She completed her M.A. in Music.

Performing career 

Shankar performed at Carnegie Hall in 2016. Countries in which she has performed include the United States, Canada, New Zealand,  Switzerland , the United Kingdom, France, Germany, Belgium, Netherlands, Hungary, the UAE, Bangladesh, Malaysia, Sri Lanka, Indonesia and Singapore.
She has performed at festivals including the Europalia, 
Sawai Gandharva Bhimsen Festival,
 
 
Yaksha (festival), 
Saptak Festival of Music, 
Aarohi for Pancham Nishad, 
ITC SRA Sangeet Sammelan, 
MERU in Netherlands, 
Jaya Smriti organised by Hema Malini, 
Temple of Fine Arts, 
Bhilwara Sur Sangam, The Association of Performing Arts of India, 
T. N. Krishnan Foundation,
Delhi International Arts Festival,
Bengal Music Foundation, 
and Dover Lane Music Conference. She has been telecast in Idea Jalsa and made a music video with her sister Ragini Shankar.

She is a part of Sakhi, India's first all-girl Indian classical musical band, formed by Kaushiki Chakraborty. She is also a part of 'inStrings', a fusion band combining various genres from across the world.

She resides in Mumbai.

Discography

Awards and honours 
Sangeetendu Pandit Lalmani Misra Kishor Adhyeta Award, 2007 
Jaya Smriti presented by Hema Malini, 2012
Jashn-e-Youngistan presented by the Vice-President of India, [Venkaiah Naidu], 2018

References

Indian violinists
Violinists
1993 births
Living people
21st-century violinists